Three regiments of the British Army have been numbered the 73rd Regiment of Foot:
 76th Regiment of Foot (1756), raised as the 61st Regiment of Foot in 1756, re-numbered as the 76th Regiment of Foot in 1758 and disbanded in 1763
 76th Regiment of Foot (MacDonald's Highlanders), raised in 1777 and disbanded in 1784
 76th Regiment of Foot, raised in 1787 and disbanded in 1881